SAAZ Komplekt, formerly known as Skopinsky Auto-Aggregate Plant is a Russian factory of automotive components (telescopic struts, shock absorbers, pneumatic-stops and gas springs). The company was established in 1962 and is a supplier of products for conveyors of AvtoVAZ, UAZ and others.

The company is controlled by United Automotive Technologies, a holding of auto parts manufacturers.

References

Auto parts suppliers of Russia
Automotive companies of the Soviet Union
Kamaz
Automotive companies established in 1962
1962 establishments in Russia
Companies based in Ryazan Oblast
Russian brands